Neil Rees may refer to:
 Neil Rees (legal scholar)
 Neil Rees (bowls)